Anna Walker may refer to:
Anna Walker (civil servant), British civil servant and regulator
Anna Walker (television presenter) (born 1962), English television presenter
Anna Maria Walker (1778–1852), Scottish botanist
Anna Louisa Walker (1836–1907), English and Canadian teacher and author

See also
Ann Walker (disambiguation)